Ioan Zaizan (born 21 July 1983) is a Romanian middle-distance runner. He competed in the 1500 metres event at the 2014 IAAF World Indoor Championships.

Competition record

References

1983 births
Living people
Romanian male middle-distance runners
Place of birth missing (living people)
Competitors at the 2003 Summer Universiade
Competitors at the 2007 Summer Universiade